Nico Siegrist (born 9 June 1991) is a Swiss football striker playing for SC Cham in the Swiss Promotion League.

Club career

FC Luzern
Nico began his career at FC Luzern and headed off to play one season at local team SC Kriens. He made his debut in the Swiss Super League during the 2008-09 season.

FC Aarau
In February 2012 Nico signed with FC Aarau of the Swiss Challenge League until the end of the 2011-12 season. On 11 February 2012, in his final game before heading to Aarau, Siegrist scored the equaliser for Luzern in a 1-1 draw away at FC Thun in the Arena Thun just 33 seconds after coming off the substitutes bench. Nico scored on his debut for Aarau on 19 February 2012, scoring after 15 minutes in a 3-2 defeat to FC Vaduz at the Rheinpark Stadion.

References

External links
football.ch profile 

1991 births
Sportspeople from Lucerne
Living people
Swiss men's footballers
Association football forwards
FC Luzern players
SC Kriens players
FC Aarau players
AC Bellinzona players
FC Biel-Bienne players
SC Cham players
Swiss 1. Liga (football) players
Swiss Super League players
Swiss Challenge League players
Swiss Promotion League players